Dolichocephala is a genus of dagger flies in the family Empididae. There are at least 50 described species in Dolichocephala.

Species
These 51 species belong to the genus Dolichocephala:

D. afflicta 
D. argus 
D. arnaudi 
D. austriaca 
D. bartaki 
D. basilicata 
D. bellstedti 
D. bicolor 
D. borkenti 
D. cavaticum 
D. chillcotti 
D. ciwatikina 
D. combinata 
D. cretica 
D. curvata 
D. duodecempunctata 
D. flamingo 
D. fugitivus 
D. fuscillanx 
D. guangdongensis 
D. guttata 
D. humanitatis 
D. immaculata 
D. incus 
D. irroata 
D. irrorata 
D. longicerca 
D. maculatissima 
D. malickyi 
D. meyi 
D. monae 
D. oblongoguttata 
D. ocellata 
D. panesari 
D. pavonica 
D. quadrispina 
D. rarinota 
D. rotundinota 
D. septemontata 
D. sinica 
D. sparsa 
D. srisukai 
D. tali 
D. teskeyi 
D. thailandensis 
D. thomasi 
D. vaillanti 
D. vockerothi 
D. walutikina 
D. woodi 
D. zwicki 

Data sources: i = ITIS, c = Catalogue of Life, g = GBIF, b = Bugguide.net

References

Articles containing video clips
Empidoidea genera
Empididae
Taxa named by Pierre-Justin-Marie Macquart